Gavril is a variant of the name Gabriel, may refer to:

Gavril Atanasov, Macedonian icon painter from Berovo in the 19th century
Gavril Bănulescu-Bodoni (1746–1821), Romanian clergyman who served as Metropolitan of Moldavia
Gavril Balint (born 1963), former Romanian football striker and current coach
Gavril Dejeu (born 1932), Romanian politician and Minister of Interior
Gavril Ilizarov (1921–1992), Russian physician, known for inventing the Ilizarov apparatus for lengthening limb bones
Gavril Krastevich, Bulgarian politician
Gavril Myasnikov (1889–1945), Russian metalworker from the Urals and Bolshevik underground activist
Gavril Olteanu, leader of a Romanian paramilitary militia group part of the Maniu guards during World War II
Gavril Radomir of Bulgaria, ruler of First Bulgarian Empire from 1014 to 1015
Gavril Sarychev (1763–1831), Russian navigator, hydrographer, admiral and Honorable Member of the Russian Academy of Sciences
Gavril Stefanović Venclović (1680–1749), Serbian writer, poet, orator and ilumminator
Gavril Yushvaev (born 1957), ethnic Mountain Jew, is a Russian businessman and shareholder of Wimm-Bill-Dann

See also
Gavriil
Gavrilo

Romanian masculine given names